Saint Kevin (modern Irish ; Old Irish , ; latinized ; 498 (reputedly)–3 June 618) is an Irish saint, known as the founder and first abbot of Glendalough in County Wicklow, Ireland. His feast day is 3 June.

Early life
Kevin's life is not well-documented because no contemporaneous material survives.

There is a late-medieval Latin Vita, preserved among the records of the Franciscan Convent in Dublin, edited by John Colgan as part of the Acta Sanctorum Hiberniae. According to that account, Kevin (like St. Columba) was of noble birth, the son of Coemlog and Coemell of Leinster. It says he was born in 498 AD at the Fort of the White Fountain and baptized by Saint Cronan of Roscrea.  His given name Coemgen (anglicized Kevin) means  "fair-begotten", or "of noble birth".  A tradition cited in the 17th century makes Kevin the pupil of Saint Petroc of Cornwall, who had come to Leinster about 492. That  claim is not found in the extant late-medieval and early-modern hagiography of the saint, and appears to be based in a  Vita breviora which the Bollandist editors obtained from Henry Fitzsimon, but which is no longer extant. 

The Vita also contains a number of legends which, according to Colgan's co-editor Francis Baert, are of "doubtful veracity", but were kept in the 17th-century edition because they were assumed to date to the medieval period. For example, the text includes an infancy legend involving a white cow, said to have come to his parents' house every morning and evening, which supplied the milk for the baby.

Glendalough

Glendalough, or the Glen of two Lakes, is one of the most important sites of monastic ruins in Ireland. Before the arrival of St. Kevin this glen would have been desolate and remote and would have been ideal for a secluded retreat.

Hermitage

Kevin was ordained by Bishop Lugidus and, following his ordination, he moved on to Glendalough in order to avoid the company of his followers. He lived as a hermit in a partially man made cave (sometimes incorrectly described as a Bronze age tomb) now known as St. Kevin's Bed, to which he was led, in the account of the Vita, by an angel. 

St. Kevin's Bed can best be described as a man-made cave cut in the rock face very close to the edge of the mountain. It is reasonable to assume that the cave could only have been used as a sleeping place, and would have been impossible for an adult to stand upright in, so it is quite likely that St Kevin only used it as his bed, or a place for pious prayer or meditation. 

There is a legend which claims that St Laurence O'Toole used the "bed" as he frequently made penitential visits to Glendalough, especially during the season of Lent. Michael Dwyer, the famous Wicklow rebel, is reputed to have taken shelter in the "bed" while he was on the run from British soldiers. The story goes that he escaped capture one morning by diving into the lake and swimming to the opposite side. Today, it is highly dangerous to try to approach the "bed" from the side of Lugduff mountain. Visitors, in the interests of their own safety, should be content with a distant view of it.

Monastery

Kevin lived the life of a hermit there with an extraordinary closeness to nature. His companions were the animals and birds all around him. He lived as a hermit for seven years wearing only animal skins, sleeping on stones and eating very sparingly.

He went barefoot and spent his time in prayer. Disciples were soon attracted to Kevin and a further settlement enclosed by a wall, called Kevin's Cell, was established nearer the lakeshore. By 540 Saint Kevin's fame as a teacher and holy man had spread far and wide. Many people came to seek his help and guidance. In time Glendalough grew into a renowned seminary of saints and scholars and the parent of several other monasteries.

In 544, Kevin went to the Hill of Uisneach in County Westmeath to visit the holy abbots, Sts. Columba, Comgall and Cannich. He then proceeded to Clonmacnoise, where St. Cieran had died three days before. Having firmly established his community, he retired into solitude for four years, and only returned to Glendalough at the earnest entreaty of his monks. Until his death around 618, Kevin presided over his monastery in Glendalough, living his life by fasting, praying and teaching.
St Kevin is one of the patron saints of the diocese of Dublin.

He belonged to the second order of Irish saints. Eventually, Glendalough, with its seven churches, became one of the chief pilgrimage destinations in Ireland.

Legacy and veneration
Kevin of Glendalough was canonized by Pope Pius X on 9 December 1903 (cultus confirmation). 

One of the most widely known poems of the Nobel prizewinner Seamus Heaney, 'St Kevin and the Blackbird', relates the story of Kevin holding out his hand with trance-like stillness while a blackbird builds a nest in it, lays eggs, the eggs hatch and the chicks fledge.
A  series of paintings by the Welsh artist Clive Hicks-Jenkins around 2009 depicted the story of Kevin and the blackbird, by way of Heaney's poem.

Kevin is remembered in popular culture as an ascetic. This is commemorated in a folk song about him which describes a legend claiming that he drowned a woman who attempted to seduce him. This was recorded and made popular by The Dubliners. The opening verse is as follows: "In Glendalough, there lived an auld saint, renowned for his learning and piety, his manners were curious and quaint, and he looked upon girls with disparity."

The independent film-maker Kevin Smith refers irreverently to his namesake "Saint Kevin" and the key events of his life in the introduction to Sold Out: A Threevening with Kevin Smith, his 2008 live Q & A show.

Kevin is referenced several times in Finnegans Wake by James Joyce. The longest episode is found in Pt IV, pgs 604–607 (Faber & Faber, Viking editions). It was one of the earliest-drafted "vignettes" and much revised before final publication.

References

Primary sources
Latin vita of St Kevin, ed. Charles Plummer, "Vita Sancti Coemgeni (Life of St. Kevin)." In Vitae Sanctorum Hiberniae. Vol. 1. Oxford: Clarendon Press, 1910. 234–57.
Irish vita of St Kevin, ed. Charles Plummer, "Betha Caimgin (Life of St. Kevin)." In Bethada Nóem nÉrenn (Live of Irish Saints). Oxford: Clarendon Press, 1922. Vol. 1: 125–67 and vol. 2: 121–61. Edition available from CELT.
Gerald of Wales, Topographia Hibernica.

Secondary sources
Barrow, Lennox. Glendalough and Saint Kevin. Dundalk: Dundalgan Press, 1972.
MacShamhrain, A.S. "The 'unity' of Cóemgen and Ciarán. A convent between Glendalough and Clonmacnoise in the tenth to eleventh centuries." In Wicklow: history and society: interdisciplinary essays on the history of an Irish county, ed. by Ken Hannigan and William Nolan. Dublin: Geography Publications, 1994. 139-50.

External links

 Article on St. Kevin from OrthodoxWiki
 St Kevin and Glendalough, the Valley of the two Lakes
 Haggerty, Bridget, "St. Kevin – founder of Glendalough", Irish Culture and Customs
 
"Kevin of Glendalough", Dublin Diocese Jubilee
"Kevin's Bed", County Wicklow

Medieval Irish saints
Irish Christian monks
7th-century Christian saints
Colombanian saints
7th-century Irish abbots
498 births
618 deaths
Medieval saints of Leinster
People from County Wicklow
Dál Messin Corb
Longevity claims
Angelic visionaries